Jesse Stone: Innocents Lost is a 2011 American made-for-television crime drama film directed by Dick Lowry and starring Tom Selleck, Kathy Baker, and Kohl Sudduth. Based on the characters from the Jesse Stone novels created by Robert B. Parker, the film is about the retired police chief of a small New England town who investigates the suspicious death of a young friend while the police force deals with the arrogant new police chief who is the son-in-law of a town councilman. Filmed on location in Nova Scotia, the story is set in the fictitious town of Paradise, Massachusetts. 

Jesse Stone: Innocents Lost is the seventh in a series of nine television films based on Jesse Stone and other characters of Parker's Jesse Stone novels. The film first aired on the CBS television network on May 22, 2011.

Plot
After being replaced as the chief of police in Paradise, Massachusetts by the town council president's son-in-law, William Butler, Jesse Stone is still without a full-time job (though he vows to one day be reinstated). Nevertheless, he continues to find ways to pursue investigations into two separate murders: one involves a friend with whom he had lost contact, and the other has him working as a consulting investigator for the Massachusetts State Police Homicide Division on a case involving a robbery and murder suspect. Both Jesse and his friend, State Police Captain Healy, have doubts as to the robbery & murder suspect's guilt. All the while, Jesse deals with tensions between Butler, who expects him to give up his "concealed carry" gun permit, but who is informed, by Rose Gammon, that as a retired (not fired) police officer he has a federally mandated right to "concealed carry" for life. His problems with his ex-wife, and drinking issues are still present.

Cast

Production
Unlike the first four films in the Jesse Stone series, Jesse Stone: Innocents Lost is not based on one of Robert B. Parker's novels. The screenplay was written by Tom Selleck and Michael Brandman. This was their second collaboration on an original Jesse Stone screenplay.

References

External links
 
 
 
 
 

2011 television films
2011 films
2011 crime drama films
American crime drama films
American police detective films
CBS network films
Crime television films
Films directed by Dick Lowry
Films scored by Jeff Beal
Films set in Massachusetts
Films shot in Nova Scotia
Murder in television
American drama television films
2010s English-language films
2010s American films